Fábio Eduardo Cribari (born 13 February 1975 in Cambará, Paraná)), better known as Binho, is a Brazilian football defender. He last played for Castelnuovo in 2006-07 season.

Football career 

He started his professional career at his state, for Londrina. In January 1998, he left for Empoli with his brother Emílson. In summer 2000, he left for Lucchese, where he played for 6 seasons, excepted on 30 January 2003, left on loan for Livorno.

External links 

  Brazilian FA database

1975 births
Living people
Brazilian footballers
Brazilian expatriate footballers
Expatriate footballers in Italy
Serie A players
Serie B players
Londrina Esporte Clube players
Empoli F.C. players
S.S.D. Lucchese 1905 players
U.S. Livorno 1915 players
Sportspeople from Paraná (state)
Association football defenders